Thu Thiri Sanda Wadi, commonly known as the Princess of Taingda, was a royal princess during the Konbaung dynasty. She was also known as a royal goldsmith, renowned for her expertise in working with gems and precious metals; she made jewelry for the royal family.

Biography 

Taingda Princess was born in 1865 at the Mandalay Palace, the daughter of Mindon Min by his consort, Tharazein Mibaya. She was one of the most beautiful daughters of King Mindon. She was granted the appanage of Taingda (a town between Sidoktaya and Minbu) and was therefore known as Taingda Hteik Khaung Tin. She also received the appanages of Myothit and, in 1875, Natmauk.

At the Rajabiseka Muddha Consecration of King Thibaw and Queen Supayalat, she was given the honor of making five speeches and beating the great royal silver gong. She was specially favoured by Chief Queen Supayalat during the reign of King Thibaw, being awarded three golden bowls of jewellery.

After the fall of the Konbaung dynasty in 1885, the princess left the Mandalay Palace. She wed her half-brother, the Prince of Kawlin (1868 - 1923), on 20 February 1902. She died in 1952 in Rangoon.

Notes

References

See also 
 Taingda Mingyi
 Konbaung dynasty
 Mindon Min

Konbaung dynasty
1865 births
1952 deaths
Burmese Buddhists
Burmese princesses